Louis Alexandre Marie Nattero (16 October 1870 – 10 November 1915 in Marseilles) was a French painter. He was known for his sea and port pictures and depictions of local street scenes and children. He also painted the Port of Toulon.

References

1870 births
1915 deaths
Artists from Marseille
20th-century French painters
20th-century French male artists
French male painters
1915 suicides
Suicides by firearm in France
19th-century French male artists